= Kofi Etsiba Shaw =

Ghanaian footballer

Kofi Shaw
Personal information
- Full name: Kofi Etsiba Shaw
- Date of birth: August 3, 1983 (age 43)
- Place of birth: Sekondi Takoradi, Ghana
- Height: 1.80 m (5 ft 11 in)

Senior career*
Years	Team	Apps	(Gls)
2007–2008	Malacca FA		
- * Club domestic league appearances and goals

Kofi Etsiba Shaw (born August 3, 1983, in Sekondi Takoradi) is a Ghanaian footballer, who played for Malacca FA in the Malaysian Super League for the 2007–2008 season.
